Enbridge Pipelines is a collection of four different systems of natural gas pipelines, all owned by Enbridge. They include the Enbridge Pipelines (AlaTenn) system, the Enbridge Pipelines (MidLa) system, the Enbridge Offshore Pipelines (UTOS) system, and the Enbridge Pipelines (KPC) system.

The AlaTenn system brings gas between Tennessee, Mississippi and Alabama. Its FERC code is 1.
 
The MidLa brings gas from southern Louisiana to northern Louisiana, through Mississippi. Its FERC code is 15.

The UTOS system gathers gas from the offshore Gulf of Mexico and brings it into Louisiana and Alabama. Its FERC code is 74.

The KPC system brings gas between Oklahoma and northeast Kansas. Its FERC code is 166.

See also
 Enbridge Pipeline System
 Enbridge Northern Gateway Pipelines
 Garden Banks Pipeline
 Nautilus Pipeline

References

External links
 Enbridge Pipelines

Natural gas pipelines in the United States
Enbridge
Natural gas pipelines in Tennessee
Natural gas pipelines in Mississippi
Natural gas pipelines in Alabama
Natural gas pipelines in Louisiana
Oil pipelines in Oklahoma
Natural gas pipelines in Kansas